The Academy of the Holy Angels is an all-female private middle school and college preparatory high school located in Demarest, in Bergen County, New Jersey, United States, serving students in sixth through twelfth grade. The school is a sponsored work of the School Sisters of Notre Dame. The Academy of the Holy Angels draws students from North Jersey, Rockland County, New York, and surrounding areas.

As of the 2019–20 school year, the school had an enrollment of 493 students and 43 classroom teachers (on an FTE basis), for a student–teacher ratio of 11.5:1. The school's student body was 52.7% (260) White, 18.7% (92) Asian, 18.7% (92) Hispanic, 5.7% (28) two or more races, 4.1% (20) Black and 0.2% (1) American Indian/
Alaska Native.

The Academy of the Holy Angels is a member of the National Catholic Educational Association and the New Jersey Association of Independent Schools.

History
The Academy of the Holy Angels is the oldest private school in Bergen County. Founded in 1879 by Sister Mary Nonna Dunphy, one of the School Sisters of Notre Dame, the school was opened in Fort Lee, New Jersey as a boarding and day school for girls from kindergarten to twelfth grade. In 1890 it was incorporated as Holy Angels, Collegiate Institute for Young Ladies and Preparatory School for Little Girls. Its motto was then and remains now "Vitae Via Virtus." The Holy Angels Board voted to change the name of the school to the Academy of the Holy Angels in 1934 when Sister M. Angeline Hughes was Principal. The school accepted a developer's offer for the school's location in Fort Lee and purchased a large property in Demarest. The school had operated a grammar school in addition to the high school for decades and many graduates were known as "12 year Angels." The grammar school was discontinued completely in 1964 prior to the move from Fort Lee. Building commenced and the school relocated to its current location in Demarest in 1965. The former site was replaced by Mediterranean Towers South at 2000 Linwood Avenue, on the northeast corner of Main Street and Linwood Avenue.

Awards and recognition
During the 1999–2000 school year, the Academy of the Holy Angels was awarded the Blue Ribbon School Award of Excellence by the United States Department of Education, the highest award an American school can receive.

The Corporation for National Service selected the Academy of the Holy Angels as a National Service-Learning Leader School, due to its excellence in service learning. Holy Angels is one of two Catholic high schools nationwide to receive this honor.

Middle States accreditation
The school is accredited by the Middle States Association of Colleges and Schools Commission on Elementary and Secondary Schools. AHA chose Accreditation for Growth, a strategic planning method in which diverse constituent groups participate in discussions, which are then used as a method for growth and improvement, both academically by the students, as well as by the institution.

Technology
Since 2005, upon entering the school, each student is required to buy a Fujitsu Tablet. Students use these tablets during school and at home to complete assignments, access the internet for research, take notes, and communicate with the faculty. Equipped with a pen and with a screen that can function as a notebook, students are able to use these tablets for all subjects such as History and Math. Features such as the Dropbox and Student Commons allow students to access notes and papers from the teachers on the school network, as well as place their own completed assignments within the folders on the network and, in effect, decrease the amount of paper used.

In addition, AHA is currently using Turnitin, a website that scans finished papers and assignments for plagiarism and helps prevent it as well. Beginning with the class of 2011, AHA began to use LiveText, an online storage site in which each student is able to upload their best papers and projects, ultimately creating their own 'online resume.'

Art
AHA facilities include four art studios and a lab for digital media.  Winter and Spring Art Shows are held annually to feature artists. The school also has an active chapter of the National Art Honor Society, Art Club, and Photography Club.

The AHA Dance Team competes annually at the UDA National Dance Team Championship, hosted at the ESPN Wide World of Sports in Orlando, FL. The squad has won five National Titles in Small Varsity Hip Hop as well as placed in the top 3 in Small Varsity Pom for the past three years.

Activities
The Academy of the Holy Angels provides a range of clubs and organizations that students can join based on their own interests and availability. In addition to after-school activities, the schedule of AHA allows a 45-minute activity period at the end of the day once a cycle, during which students can participate in in-school clubs and organizations. There are two cycles that alternate, and students can, therefore, choose two in-school activities to participate in.

In-school activities

 AHAnime
 Armenian Club
 Art for the Community
 Asian Cultural Society
 Black and Hispanic Cultural Society
 Blueprint Literary Magazine
 Book Club
 Comic Book Heroes on Film
 CSI Angels
 Deep Relaxation
 Diversity Club
 Drama Club
 Echoes Yearbook
 Embroidery Club
 French Club
 French for Travelers
 Go Green
 History Society
 I'm Puzzled
 Instrumental Ensemble/Orchestra
 International Students Club 
 Italian Club
 Japanese Club
 Latin Dancing
 Lean In
 Literature on Film
 Math Club/3D Design
 Math Tutoring
 M.E.D.S.
 Music Makers
 Outreach
 Pen Pals
 Project Greenhouse
 Quillow 101
 Quick and Easy Crafts
 Real Life 101
 Roman Personalities on Film
 SADD
 Scrabble, Checkers, Chess
 Spanish Club
 Student Athletic Association
 Student Council
 Study Period
 Ultimate Frisbee
 Yoga
 Young Entrepreneur

After-school activities

 Academy Chorus
 Advisory Council   
 AHA Dance Team
 AHA Voice (newspaper)   
 AHAnime
 Angel Ambassadors   
 Angels for Animals   
 Angels For Life
 Angels over Africa   
 Art Club
 Asian Cultural Society   
 Big/Little Sister   
 Black & Hispanic Cultural Association   
 Blueprint Literary Magazine 
 Book Club
 Bridges
 Chess
 CSI Angels (Forensics)
 Dean's Council   
 Debate   
 Drama Club
 Drawing from Model
 Echoes (yearbook)
 Embroidery
 E-portfolio
 Equality Now   
 Equestrian
 Eucharistic Ministers   
 French Club   
 Gaelic Society   
 GO Green   
 Habitat for Humanity   
 Handbell
 Hellenic Angels
 Honduras Club   
 Instrumental Ensemble
 Italian Club   
 Jazz Band
 Jeweled Angels
 JOY (Joining Old & Young)   
 Just Angels   
 Knitwits
 Korean Club
 Liturgical Ministers   
 Math Club
 MEDS
 Middle Eastern Club   
 Mock Trial   
 Model UN
 Music Makers   
 Operation Smile   
 Orchestra
 Outreach   
 Photography
 Quidditch
 Quiz Bowl
 Retreat Leadership Teams   
 SADD
 Service Organizations
 ScoliAngels
 Space Angels
 Spanish Club   
 Stress Busters
 Student Athletic Association
 Student Council
 Theater Productions
 Vocal Ensemble
 Walking for Fitness
 Watercolor Painting
 Writers' Club

Honors Societies
 National Honor Society
 Mu Alpha Theta (National Mathematics Honor Society)
 Thespian Honor Society (Performing Arts)
 National Science Honor Society
 Società Onoraria Italica (Italian Language)
 Societas Latina Honoris (Latin Language)
 Société Honoraire de Français (French Language)
 Sociedad Honoraria Hispánica (Spanish Language)
 Tri-M Honor Society (Music)
 Rho Kappa (National Social Studies Honor Society)
 NBEA (National Business Honor Society)
 National Art Honor Society

Athletics
The Angels of the Academy of the Holy Angels compete in the Big North Conference, which is comprised of public and private high schools in Bergen and Passaic counties, and was established following a reorganization of sports leagues in Northern New Jersey by the New Jersey State Interscholastic Athletic Association. Prior to realignment in 2010, the school competed in the North Bergen Interscholastic Athletic League, which consisted of public and private high schools located in Bergen County. With 866 students in grades 10–12, the school was classified by the NJSIAA for the 2019–20 school year as Non-Public A for most athletic competition purposes, which included schools with an enrollment of 381 to 1,454 students in that grade range (equivalent to Group I for public schools).

The Academy of the Holy Angels has a long-standing rivalry with fellow Catholic school, Immaculate Heart Academy in Washington Township. In 2018, the varsity soccer team beat the Eagles 1-0 for the first time in history.

The cross country team won the Non-Public A state titles in both 2006 and 2009.

Basketball coach Susan Liddy was recognized in fall 2008 for having reached a milestone 600th win.

The tennis team won the Non-Public A state championship in 2015 (defeating Eustace Preparatory School in the final match of the tournament) and in 2018 (vs. Pingry School). The 2015 team ran their record for the season to 16-0 after winning the Non-Public A state title over Bishop Eustace 4–1 in the tournament finals at Mercer County Park.

The bowling team won the Group II state championship in 2015.

Sports offered to students at AHA include:

Fall sports
 Cross country running
 Gymnastics
 Soccer
 Tennis
 Volleyball
 Bergen Catholic Varsity Cheer
 St. Joseph's Varsity Cheer

Winter sports
 Basketball
 Bowling
 Fencing
 Indoor track

Spring sports
 Golf
 Lacrosse
 Softball
 Track and field

Alma mater 
The official alma mater for Holy Angels was written by Margaret Mary Powers Gidez (Class of 1942).  The original lyrics of the first two lines were, "With stately dome arising high and golden cross above." When the Academy relocated to Demarest in 1965, the lyrics were changed to reflect the move.

Notable alumnae
 Greta Kiernan (born 1933), politician who served in the New Jersey General Assembly from the 39th Legislative District from 1978 to 1980.

In popular culture
In the 1947 noir film Kiss of Death the Academy, then located in Fort Lee, was the setting of an orphanage where main character Nick Bianco (played by Victor Mature) visits his daughters.  The film was directed by Henry Hathaway and the nun in the orphanage was portrayed by Eva Condon.

References

External links
Academy of the Holy Angels
Data for the Academy of the Holy Angels, National Center for Education Statistics

1879 establishments in New Jersey
Demarest, New Jersey
Girls' schools in New Jersey
Middle States Commission on Secondary Schools
New Jersey Association of Independent Schools
Private high schools in Bergen County, New Jersey
Catholic secondary schools in New Jersey
Educational institutions established in 1879
Roman Catholic Archdiocese of Newark
School Sisters of Notre Dame schools